Zoni (before 1928: Ζουνάτι - Zounati) is a village in Arcadia, Greece. It is part of the municipal unit of Gortyna. It is situated in the southwestern foothills of the Mainalo mountains, at about 500 m elevation. It is 2 km northeast of Katsimpalis, 7 km southeast of Karytaina and 7 km north of Megalopoli.

The village is first mentioned in 1810. It was the seat of the Verenthi Municipality (Δήμος Βερένθης), named after the ancient town Brenthe, between 1835 and 1841.

Historical population

See also
List of settlements in Arcadia

References

External links
History and information about Zoni

Populated places in Arcadia, Peloponnese